Ingrid Bergman was a Swedish actress who appeared in a number of critically acclaimed European and American films and television series. She subsequently received a number of awards, primarily during the 1940s and 1950s, though she did receive some recognition during the 1930s, 1960s, 1970s, and 1980s. She is best remembered for her roles as Isla Lund in Casablanca, and Alicia Huberman in Notorious, but despite the critical success of both films, she was a notable absence from the nominations they received in their subsequent awards seasons.

The first role for which she received major awards recognition was 1943's For Whom the Bell Tolls, an American war film which was released in the same year as Casablanca, and for which she received an Academy Award nomination for Best Actress, but failed to win, losing to Jennifer Jones for The Song of Bernadette. This was the first of three Academy Award nominations she received three years in a row, along with 1944's Gaslight, an American mystery-thriller film, and 1945's The Bells of St. Mary's, an American drama film. Her performance in Gaslight earned her the first of her two Academy Awards for Best Actress, as well as her first Golden Globe (for Best Actress – Motion Picture Drama), resulting from her first of eight eventual nominations and four wins.

Outside of the United States, she also received recognition in the United Kingdom for her performance as Gladys Aylward in the British war film The Inn of the Sixth Happiness, for which she was nominated for the BAFTA for Best Foreign Actress, though she went on to lose to Simone Signoret for Room at the Top. In Italy, too, she came to prominence for her role in Europe '51, an Italian neorealist film, for which she won the Nastro d'Argento for Best Actress. In Germany, she received five Bambi Awards, whilst in France, she was awarded an honorary César in 1976.

By the 1970s, Bergman had already received two Academy Awards from five nominations, but went on to be nominated twice more, winning for a third time, this time in the category of Best Supporting Actress, for 1974's Murder on the Orient Express, based on the Agatha Christie novel of the same name, for which she also received her first and only BAFTA. Her Oscar nomination for Autumn Sonata was the first she had received for a film in her native language of Swedish. Though she ultimately lost to Jane Fonda for Coming Home, she did win her second David di Donatello for Best Foreign Actress.

Bergman won three Academy Awards for acting - two for Best Actress, and one for Best Supporting Actress. She ranks tied for second place in terms of Oscars won, with Walter Brennan (all three for Best Supporting Actor), Jack Nicholson (two for Best Actor, and one for Best Supporting Actor), Meryl Streep (two for Best Actress, and one for Best Supporting Actress), Daniel Day-Lewis (all three for Best Actor), and Frances McDormand (all three for Best Actress). Katharine Hepburn still holds the record, with four (all four for Best Actress).

Major Film Awards

Academy Awards

BAFTA Awards

Golden Globe Awards

Major National Awards

Bambi Awards (Germany)

César Awards (France)

David di Donatello (Italy)

Television Awards

Emmy Awards (Primetime)

Theatre Awards

Tony Awards

Critics' Awards

Italian National Syndicate of Film Journalists

Los Angeles Film Critics Association

Motion Picture Exhibitor Magazine

National Board of Review

National Society of Film Critics

New York Film Critics Circle

Online Film & Television Association

Photoplay

Festival Awards

Venice Film Festival

Other

All-Time Rankings

Golden Apple Awards

Hollywood Walk of Fame

See also 

 Ingrid Bergman performances

References

Bergman, Ingrid